Ali Yousif Hashim Najatee (born 19 January 1996), known as Ali Yousif, is an Iraqi professional footballer who plays as a forward for Al-Zawraa and the Iraqi national team.

Coming up through the youth ranks at Al-Quwa Al-Jawiya, Yousif broke into the first team in 2014, aged 18, and spent his early career with the Iraqi giants, spending the 2016-17 season out on loan at Naft Al-Wasat and Baghdad FC before returning to his parent club and establishing himself as a key player for them, winning the AFC Cup twice with the falcons, in 2017 and 2018. In 2019, he signed for defending champions Al-Shorta, allowing Yousif to play in the AFC Champions League for the first time in his career. He won his first trophy with Al-Shorta soon after joining, winning the 2019 Super Cup.

Club career

Al-Shorta
In the summer of 2019, Ali signed for defending Iraqi Premier League champions Al-Shorta, coming in as the replacement for former star and fan favourite Mohanad Ali, who had left to join Qatari side Al-Duhail for a rumoured $1.2 million. In February during Al-Shorta’s Premier League match against Al-Kahrabaa, Yousif suffered a bad injury which would end his season and keep him out for no less than 6 months.

International career

Iraq
Yousif received his first international call-up as part of Iraq’s 2021 FIFA Arab Cup squad. He made his debut for Iraq in their final group match against Qatar, coming off the bench.

Honours

Club 
Al-Quwa Al-Jawiya
AFC Cup: 2017, 2018

Al-Shorta
Iraqi Premier League: 2021–22
Iraqi Super Cup: 2019

References

1996 births
Living people
Association football forwards
Iraqi footballers
Al-Shorta SC players
Iraq international footballers